The New Adventures of Pinocchio may refer to:

The New Adventures of Pinocchio (TV series), American show syndicated starting 1960–61, directed by Arthur Rankin, Jr.
The New Adventures of Pinocchio (film), 1999 film directed by Michael Anderson

See also
 The Adventures of Pinocchio (disambiguation)
Pinocchio (disambiguation)